Suola is a rural locality (a selo) and the administrative center of Meldekhsinsky Rural Okrug of Megino-Kangalassky District in the Sakha Republic, Russia, located  from Mayya, the administrative center of the district. Its population as of the 2010 Census was 505; down from 515 recorded in the 2002 Census.

It is one of the centers of population located in the Suola River basin.

References

Notes

Sources
Official website of the Sakha Republic. Registry of the Administrative-Territorial Divisions of the Sakha Republic. Megino-Kangalassky District. 

Rural localities in Megino-Kangalassky District